Knebworth railway station serves the village of Knebworth in Hertfordshire, England. Train services are currently provided by Thameslink.

History
The main line of the Great Northern Railway was completed in 1852. A station at Knebworth was opened on 1 February 1884. The original timber buildings were replaced by brick and glass structures in 1989.

Facilities

In 2009 First Capital Connect installed tactile surfaces to the stations stairways, after it gained funding from the Department for Transport as part of its "Access For All" scheme, although there is no step-free access to any of the four platforms. In 2019, a further £750,000 refurbishment saw the platform shelters replaced.

Services
All services at Knebworth are operated by Thameslink using  EMUs.

The typical off-peak service in trains per hour is:
 2 tph to 

During the peak hours, all services are extended beyond Letchworth Garden City to Cambridge. On Sundays, the station is served by an hourly service between London King's Cross and Cambridge.

Former services
Until early 2021, two trains per hour ran direct to London King's Cross during the morning peak period, with a similar non-stopping service in the opposite direction during the evening peak.

Additional non-stopping services to Knebworth from London King's Cross ran hourly throughout the evening on weekdays, with a typical journey time of 19 minutes.

This service provided by Great Northern was withdrawn as a cost-saving measure following the Covid-19 pandemic. The British Rail Class 365 EMUs serving this route were withdrawn from service shortly afterwards.

Additional fast services were included in the proposed May 2022 timetable consultation but were not implemented.

Knebworth residents have established a petition to restore the fast service.

References

External links

Former Great Northern Railway stations
Railway stations in Great Britain opened in 1884
Railway stations in Hertfordshire
DfT Category E stations
Railway stations served by Govia Thameslink Railway
railway station